Andrew Buchanan may refer to:

 Andrew Buchanan of Drumpellier (1690–1759), tobacco lord and Lord Provost of Glasgow, 1740–1742
 Andrew Buchanan (American politician) (1780–1848), US Representative from Pennsylvania
 Andrew Buchanan (surgeon) (1798–1882), first Regius Professor of Physiology at the University of Glasgow 
 Andrew Buchanan (New Zealand politician) (1806–1877), member of the New Zealand Legislative Council
 Sir Andrew Buchanan, 1st Baronet (1807–1882), British diplomat
 Sir Andrew Buchanan, 5th Baronet (born 1937), owner of Hodsock Priory and Lord Lieutenant of Nottinghamshire 
 Andrew Buchanan (figure skater), British figure skater
 Drew Buchanan, fictional character in the American soap opera One Life to Live

See also
 Andrew Buchan (born 1979), English actor